Winner Takes All is the seventeenth studio album by The Isley Brothers and their first and only double album, released on T-Neck Records on August 21, 1979. The album included the number-one R&B hit, "I Wanna Be With You" and the top 20 UK disco hit, "It's a Disco Night (Rock Don't Stop)".

The album was remastered and expanded for inclusion in the 2015 released CD box set The RCA Victor & T-Neck Album Masters, 1959-1983.

Reception

The album continued the brothers' trademark of mixing uptempo funk numbers with softer soul balladry. However, their sound now included elements of disco. While some of their music had pioneered the genre, Winner Takes All was the first album to embrace disco rhythms.

The disco element helped songs such as "I Wanna Be With You" and "It's a Disco Night (Rock Don't Stop)" become hits. However, the band didn't release any ballads from the album, making it one of the few times since 1973 that they not released a ballad as a single. However, ballads like "You're Beside Me" and "How Lucky I Am" still received airplay on quiet storm radio formats.

The album was successful enough on both the pop and R&B album charts where it reached #14 and #3 respectively and eventually went gold after selling past 500,000 copies.

Track listing
Unless otherwise noted, Information is based on Liner notes

Personnel
Performance
Ronald Isley - lead vocals, background vocals
O'Kelly Isley, Jr. - background vocals  
Rudolph Isley - additional lead vocals (B5), background vocals 
Ernie Isley - maracas, drums, congas, timbales, percussion, maracas, guitar, background vocals 
Marvin Isley - background vocals, bass, percussion
Chris Jasper - piano, clavinet, ARP synthesizer, keyboards, congas, percussion, background vocals

Technical
George Carnell - assistant engineer
John Holbrook - recording engineer, synthesizer programming

Charts

Singles

External links
 The Isley Brothers-Winner Takes All at Discogs

References

1979 albums
The Isley Brothers albums
T-Neck Records albums